Mark Richard Adair (born 27 March 1996) is an Irish international cricketer from Northern Ireland, currently playing for Northern Knights in domestic cricket. He has played county cricket in England for Warwickshire County Cricket Club. He is a right-arm fast bowler, who also bats right-handed. He made his international debut in May 2019. In January 2020, he was one of nineteen players to be awarded a central contract from Cricket Ireland, the first year in which all contracts were awarded on a full-time basis.

Domestic and T20 career
Adair's first wicket in first-class cricket was Marcus Trescothick. He made his Twenty20 debut on 27 May 2016 for Warwickshire against Worcestershire Rapids in the 2016 NatWest t20 Blast and his List A debut in the 2017 Royal London One-Day Cup on 10 May 2017.

In July 2019, Adair was selected to play for the Belfast Titans in the inaugural edition of the Euro T20 Slam cricket tournament. However, the following month the tournament was cancelled.

In May 2022, in the 2022 Inter-Provincial Cup, Adair scored his first century in List A cricket, with 108 runs against Munster Reds.

International career
In June 2016, Adair was named in Ireland's One Day International (ODI) squad for their series against Afghanistan, that took place the following month, but he did not play. In May 2019, he was added to Ireland's squad for the one-off ODI against England. He made his ODI debut for Ireland against England on 3 May 2019.

In June 2019, Adair was named in the Ireland Wolves squad for their home series against the Scotland A cricket team. Later the same month, he was named in Ireland's squad for their series against Zimbabwe.

In July 2019, Adair was named in Ireland's Test squad for their one-off match against England at Lord's. He made his Twenty20 International (T20I) debut for Ireland against Zimbabwe on 12 July 2019. He made his Test debut for Ireland, against England, on 24 July 2019. The following month, he was awarded a central contract by Cricket Ireland.

In September 2019, Adair was named in Ireland's squad for the 2019 ICC T20 World Cup Qualifier tournament in the United Arab Emirates. He was the leading wicket-taker for Ireland in the tournament, with twelve dismissals in eight matches.

On 10 July 2020, Adair was named in Ireland's 21-man squad to travel to England to start training behind closed doors for the ODI series against the England cricket team. Adair was added to Ireland's squad for the third and final ODI of the series.

In February 2021, Adair was named in the Ireland Wolves' squad for their tour to Bangladesh. In July 2021, he was named in the Ireland's ODI squad against South Africa. In September 2021, Adair was named in Ireland's provisional squad for the 2021 ICC Men's T20 World Cup. Adair was named in Ireland's Test squad for their tour of Bangladesh in March 2023. He was also named in the T20I and ODI squads for the tour.

References

External links
 

1996 births
Living people
Irish cricketers
Ireland Test cricketers
Ireland One Day International cricketers
Ireland Twenty20 International cricketers
Cricketers from Northern Ireland
People from Holywood, County Down
Warwickshire cricketers
Northern Knights cricketers